Tiffany T. Alston (born April 22, 1977) is an American politician who represented Prince George's County District 24 in the Maryland House of Delegates since January 2023, and from January 2011 to January 2013. She was suspended from office in 2012 after being found guilty of stealing General Assembly funds to pay an employee at her law firm.

Background
Alston was born in Washington, D.C., and grew up in Prince George's County. She attended Seat Pleasant Elementary School. She graduated from the University of Maryland, College Park with a Bachelor of Arts in criminology & criminal justice and from David A. Clarke School of Law with a Juris Doctor in 2002.

From 1999 to 2001, she was a volunteer teacher with the AmeriCorps National Service Corporation. From 2004 to 2005, she served as a Chief of Staff within the Division of Correction at the Maryland Department of Public Safety & Correctional Services. She is a former mentor of the I Have a Dream Foundation, and a member  of Sigma Gamma Rho Sorority, Inc.

From 2004 to 2012, she practiced law with her own law firm, which was located in Upper Marlboro, Maryland. Alston's law license was suspended by the Maryland Court of Appeals on September 25, 2012, and she was disbarred on May 3, 2013.

In the legislature
Alston was a member of the House of Delegates from 2011 to 2013 and served on the Judiciary committee. She was a member of the Prince George's County Delegation, the Women's Caucus, and the Legislative Black Caucus of Maryland.

Marriage equality
During the 2011 legislative session, Alston was a co-sponsor of "Religious Freedom and Civil Marriage Protection Act". A similar bill was filed in the Maryland Senate (SB 116 - Civil Marriage Protection Act) and was assigned to the House Judiciary Committee, the committee on which Alston served. During the committee voting session on SB 116, Alston revoked her co-sponsorship and instead offered an amendment to change the bill from same-sex marriage to civil unions. The amendment failed, and Alston then voted against the bill. Despite Alston's vote, SB 116 was approved by the committee 12-10 and was forwarded to the full House of Delegates for final approval, but the bill was eventually sent back to committee, effectively terminating the bill for the session.

Alston voted against the Civil Marriage Protection Act in committee when it was re-introduced in the 2012 legislative session, but voted for the bill after it was amended to block the bill from going into effect if efforts to bring it to a referendum were being litigated.

Criminal charges
Alston was indicted in an Anne Arundel County courtroom with embezzlement on September 24, 2011 on one count each of felony and misdemeanor theft, misappropriation by a fiduciary and two election law offenses for allegedly using Maryland General Assembly funds and her election campaign funds to cover her wedding expenses and to pay an employee of her law firm.

Alston was found guilty of misdemeanor theft of General Assembly funds and misconduct in office on June 12, 2012. The judge postponed sentencing until after a separate trial, scheduled for October 2012, on the charges regarding Alston's use of her 2010 campaign funds to pay her wedding-related expenses. On October 9, 2012, the judge struck the jury verdict and entered probation before judgement after Alston entered a plea deal agreed to pay $800 in restitution to the General Assembly and complete 300 hours of community service. On October 10, 2012, General Assembly Counsel Daniel A. Friedman announced that Alston was suspended from her office without pay or benefits due to a Maryland constitutional provision. Alston sued to try to get her legislative job back, but the Maryland Court of Appeals ruled against her on January 4, 2013.

Post-legislative career
In February 2014, Alston filed to run for the Maryland House of Delegates in District 24, seeking to gain her old seat back from Darren Swain. In order to run for this seat, Alston had to pay the Maryland State Board of Elections back for the $750 in late fees that she owed for failing to file timely campaign finance reports. She came in fourth place in the Democratic primary, receiving 13.0 percent of the vote.

In 2017, Alston filed to run for Maryland Senate, seeking to challenge two-term incumbent Joanne C. Benson. She received 31.5 percent of the vote in the Democratic primary election.

In 2022, Alston filed to run for the Maryland House of Delegates in District 24, seeking to succeed state delegate Jazz Lewis, who was running for Congress in Maryland's 4th congressional district.

Electoral history

References

Democratic Party members of the Maryland House of Delegates
21st-century American politicians
21st-century American women politicians
21st-century African-American women
21st-century African-American politicians
20th-century African-American people
20th-century African-American women
1977 births
Living people
Maryland lawyers
African-American state legislators in Maryland
University of Maryland, College Park alumni
David A. Clarke School of Law alumni
African-American women in politics
Women state legislators in Maryland
People from Mitchellville, Maryland
Politicians from Washington, D.C.